The Battle of Chandawar was fought in 1194 between Muhammad of Ghor and Jayachandra of the Gahadavala dynasty. It took place at Chandawar (modern Chandawal near Firozabad), on the Yamuna River close to Agra. The victory of this battle gave Muhammad control of much of North India. The battle was hotly contested, until Jayachandra was killed and his army routed.

Notes

Sources

Chandawar
Chandawar
1193 in Asia
12th century in India
Chandawar
Chandawar